Welbourne Hill Station is a pastoral lease in the Australian state of South Australia which operates as a cattle station. The town of Marla  is located within its western end. In April 2013, the land occupying the appropriate extent of the Welbourne Hill pastoral lease was gazetted by the Government of South Australia as a locality under the name Welbourne Hill.

See also
List of ranches and stations
Robin Kankapankatja
Marla Airport

References

 

Stations (Australian agriculture)
Pastoral leases in South Australia
Far North (South Australia)